Saint-Georges-sur-Meuse (literally Saint-Georges on Meuse) is a municipality of Wallonia located in the province of Liège, Belgium. 

On January 1, 2006, Saint-Georges-sur-Meuse had a total population of 6,613. The total area is 20.90 km² which gives a population density of 316 inhabitants per km².

The municipality also includes the following population centres: Dommartin, la Mallieue, Saint-Georges-sur-Meuse, Stockay, Sur-les-Bois, Tincelle, Warfée, Warfusée, and Yernawe.

See also
 List of protected heritage sites in Saint-Georges-sur-Meuse

References

External links
 

Municipalities of Liège Province